Eupterote radiata is a moth in the family Eupterotidae. It was described by Francis Walker in 1866. It is found on Luzon in the Philippines.

Adults are bright yellow to deep yellow, sometimes with traces of two faint dark dots in the anal edge of the forewings and of a postdiscal fascia.

References

Moths described in 1866
Eupterotinae
Insects of the Philippines